Christopher J. Wills (born 1938) is Professor Emeritus of Biology at UCSD.

He received his Ph.D. from UC Berkeley. As a Guggenheim Fellow, he worked at the Karolinska Institute, Stockholm, on protein chemistry and evolution.

He is the author of The Runaway Brain: The Evolution of Human Uniqueness (1994),  Children Of Prometheus, The Accelerating Pace Of Human Evolution (1999), The Spark Of Life: Darwin And The Primeval Soup  (2001) and The Darwinian Tourist: Viewing the World Through Evolutionary Eyes (late 2010). Children of Prometheus was a finalist for the Aventis Prize in 2000. He received the 1998 Award for the Public Understanding of Science and Technology from the American Association for the Advancement of Science.

References

External links
UCSD page

1938 births
Living people
Human evolution theorists
American biochemists
University of California, San Diego faculty
University of California, Berkeley alumni